Kenneth William Stewart (born 3 January 1953) is a former New Zealand rugby union player. A flanker, Stewart represented Southland at a provincial level, and was a member of the New Zealand national side, the All Blacks, from 1972 to 1981. He played 55 matches for the All Blacks including 13 internationals.

References

1953 births
Living people
People from Gore, New Zealand
People educated at Otago Boys' High School
New Zealand rugby union players
New Zealand international rugby union players
Southland rugby union players
Rugby union flankers
Rugby union players from Southland, New Zealand